The Carolina madtom (Noturus furiosus) is a species of fish in the family Ictaluridae. It is endemic to North Carolina. It is a small catfish, reaching a maximum length of nearly five inches. Described in the late-1800s by ichthyologists Jordan and Meek, this fish is the only madtom that is endemic to North Carolina, as indicated by its common name.

Appearance 
When compared to other madtoms, the Carolina madtom has a short, chunky body and a distinct color pattern. Three dark saddles along its back connect a wide, black stripe along its side extending from its snout to the base of its tail. The adipose fin has a dark blotch that does not quite reach the fin's edge, giving the impression of a fourth saddle. Yellowish to tan blotches space the saddles, while the rest of the fish is tan. The belly is un-speckled, and the tail has crescent-shaped brown bands near its edge and center. Its pectoral spines have well-defined serrated (saw-like) projections along both margins. Stinging spines in its pectoral fins, earn this fish the “furiosus” title that is part of its scientific name.

Habitat 
The species occurs in riffles, runs, and pools in medium to large streams and rivers. Ideally, it inhabits fresh waters with continuous, year-round flow and moderate gradient in both the Piedmont and Coastal Plain physiographic regions. Optimal substrate for the Carolina madtom is predominantly silt-free, stable, gravel and cobble bottom habitat, and it must have cover for nest sites, including under rocks, bark, relic mussel shells, and even cans and bottles.

Diet 
The Carolina madtom is a sight feeder most active during the night, with peaks at dawn and dusk. It eats bottom-dwelling invertebrates such as larval midges, mayflies, caddisflies, dragonflies and beetle larvae.

Life history 
Females produce anywhere from 80 to 300 eggs per season and lay them in cover areas.  Males guard the nest until the eggs hatch.  Juveniles grow about two inches in their first two years and then mature between age two and three. It is not certain how long these fish live, but they at least reach four years of age.

The Carolina madtom occurs only in portions of the Tar and Neuse river basins in North Carolina. It tends to occupy the relatively larger streams that flow into the Tar and Neuse rivers, which further limits its range and abundance. Because the species has a restricted range and occurs only in certain types of waters, the N.C. Natural Heritage Program lists the Carolina madtom as “Significantly Rare” for the Tar River Basin population and as a species of “Special Concern” for the Neuse River Basin population. Its small size makes it unappealing to anglers, and it is classified as a nongame species.

Conservation challenges 

The Carolina Madtom faces a variety of threats from declines in water quality, loss of stream flow, riparian and instream fragmentation, deterioration of instream habitats, and expansion of the invasive predator Flathead catfish. These threats are expected to be exacerbated by urbanization and climate change.

Pollution 
The Carolina madtom needs clean, flowing water to survive. Human-caused increases in river water temperatures have been identified as a factor in the decline of the madtom.

Reduced stream flow 
Drought and impoundments slow down the natural flow of streams, compromise water quality, hamper fish movement, limit available prey, and prevent waste and fine sediments from flushing out of the stream.

Agriculture and development 
Streams with urbanized or agriculturally dominated riparian corridors tend to have more sediment in the water and unstable banks and/or impervious surface runoff, resulting in less suitable streams for fish as compared to habitat with forested corridors.

Habitat fragmentation 
Dams and perched or undersized culverts limit the madtom's ability to distribute throughout streams to find good quality habitat. For example, the construction of Falls Lake dam in the upper Neuse isolated Carolina madtoms in the upper basin from the middle Neuse basin. Isolated or patchy distributions of fish may limit genetic exchange.

Invasive species 
The flathead catfish is an invasive top predator in the Neuse and Tar River basins, upon which no other creatures prey. It feeds mostly on other fish. Hydrilla is an invasive, submerged aquatic plant that forms nearly impenetrable mats of stems and leaves at the surface of the water. It alters stream habitat, decreases flows, and contributes to sediment buildup in streams.

References

Noturus
Endemic fauna of North Carolina
Freshwater fish of the Southeastern United States
Fish described in 1889
Taxa named by David Starr Jordan
Taxonomy articles created by Polbot